Anghel Saligny (19 April 1854, Șerbănești, Moldavia – 17 June 1925, Bucharest, Romania) was a Romanian engineer, most famous for designing the Fetești-Cernavodă railway bridge (1895) over the Danube, the longest bridge in Europe at that time. He also designed the storage facilities in Constanța seaport, one of the earliest examples of reinforced concrete architecture in Europe.

Biography

Saligny was born in Șerbănești, Tecuci County (nowadays, Galați County). His father, Alfred Saligny, an educator of French descent, was an immigrant to Moldavia, coming from Prussia. He started his studies at the boarding school founded by his father in Focșani, then went on to high school, initially also in Focșani and then in Potsdam, Germany. He pursued engineering studies at the Royal Technical Higher School in Charlottenburg, and then contributed to the construction of railways in Saxony (Cottbus-Frankfurt an der Oder). He was a founding member of the Bucharest Polytechnic Society (the precursor of today's Politehnica University of Bucharest) and was even appointed Minister of Public Works. In 1892, he was elected a member of the Romanian Academy, and he served as its president between 1907 and 1910.

Anghel Saligny's brother Alfons Oscar Saligny was a chemist and educator who was also elected a member of the Romanian Academy.

Works

In all of his works (bridges, roads, silos, ports etc.), new elements are to be found. Some of them were considered great technological advances at the time.

Saligny drew the plans for the Adjud–Târgu Ocna railway, which included the first mixed-use (railway and highway) bridges in Romania (1881–1882). He was also involved in the construction of numerous other metallic bridges, such as the one at Cosmești over the Siret River, which measured  in length.

Between 1884 and 1889, Saligny planned and built the first silos in the world made of reinforced concrete, which are preserved today in Constanța, Brăila, and Galați. In the port of Constanța, he designed a special pool to allow oil export and two silos for grain export.

Saligny's most important work was the King Carol I Bridge over the Danube at Cernavodă. Although a public offer had been held by the Romanian government for the erection of a bridge in that location, all projects were found to be subpar and subsequently rejected. Taking Saligny's previous experience into account, the Romanian government hired him and gave him the daunting (at the time) task to draw up the plans for the new structure. Construction work for the bridge started 26 November 1890, in the presence of King Carol I of Romania. At the time, it was the longest bridge in Europe, and the second longest bridge in the world. The structure was famous for its era, competing with Gustave Eiffel's engineering works in France — the Garabit viaduct and the Eiffel Tower in Paris.

See also 
 Anghel Saligny Bridge

References

External links

 Welcome to romaniatravel.com short bio on travel website

1854 births
1925 deaths
People from Liești
Romanian people of French descent
Technical University of Berlin alumni
Bridge engineers
Concrete pioneers
Romanian engineers
Presidents of the Romanian Academy
Romanian Ministers of Public Works